The 2022 Asian Women's Volleyball Cup, so-called 2022 AVC Cup for Women was the seventh edition of the Asian Cup, a biennial international volleyball tournament organised by the Asian Volleyball Confederation (AVC) with Philippine National Volleyball Federation (PNVF). The tournament was held at PhilSports Arena, Pasig, Philippines from 21 to 29 August 2022.

As hosts, Philippines automatically qualified for the tournament, while the remaining 9 teams, qualified from the 2019 Asian Women's Volleyball Championship in Seoul, South Korea.

Japan won their first ever title, winning over China in the final.

Qualification 

The 10 AVC member associations qualified for the 2022 Asian Women's Volleyball Cup. Philippines qualified as hosts and the 9 remaining teams qualified from the 2019 Asian Championship and wild card entry. But later Indonesia withdrew and Australia took its place, Kazakhstan also withdrew. The 9 AVC member associations were from four zonal associations, including, Central Asia (1 teams), East Asia (4 teams), Oceania (1 team) and Southeast Asia (3 teams).

Qualified teams 
The following teams qualified for the tournament.

Pools composition 
The overview of pools was released on 17 March 2022.

* Kazakhstan withdrew from the tournament on 16 August 2022

Venue 
The three-color Gerflor floor was installed at the venue for this tournament is provided by FIVB through the Volleyball Empowerment program.

Pool standing procedure 
 Total number of victories (matches won, matches lost)
 In the event of a tie, the following first tiebreaker will apply: The teams will be ranked by the most point gained per match as follows:
 Match won 3–0 or 3–1: 3 points for the winner, 0 points for the loser
 Match won 3–2: 2 points for the winner, 1 point for the loser
 Match forfeited: 3 points for the winner, 0 points (0–25, 0–25, 0–25) for the loser
 If teams are still tied after examining the number of victories and points gained, then the AVC will examine the results in order to break the tie in the following order:
 Set quotient: if two or more teams are tied on the number of points gained, they will be ranked by the quotient resulting from the division of the number of all set won by the number of all sets lost.
 Points quotient: if the tie persists based on the set quotient, the teams will be ranked by the quotient resulting from the division of all points scored by the total of points lost during all sets.
 If the tie persists based on the point quotient, the tie will be broken based on the team that won the match of the Round Robin Phase between the tied teams. When the tie in point quotient is between three or more teams, these teams ranked taking into consideration only the matches involving the teams in question.

Squads
The full list of team squads were announced on the competition daily bulletin.

Preliminary round 
All times are Philippine Standard Time (UTC+08:00).

Pool A 

|}

|}

Pool B 

|}

|}

Final round 
All times are Philippine Standard Time (UTC+8:00).

Quarterfinals 
|}

5th–8th semifinals 
|}

Semifinals 
|}

7th place match 
|}

5th place match 
|}

3rd place match 
|}

Final 
|}

Final standings

Awards 

Most Valuable Player

Best Setter

Best Outside Spikers

Best Middle Blockers

Best Opposite Spiker

Best Libero

See also 
2022 Asian Men's Volleyball Cup
2022 Asian Women's Volleyball Challenge Cup

References

External links 
 Asian Volleyball Confederation – official website
 Competition Regulation

2022
Asian Cup
Asian Cup, Women
2022 in Asian women's sport
Vo
August 2022 sports events in the Philippines
2022 in volleyball